Pieces is a 1982 Spanish-American slasher film directed by Juan Piquer Simón, written and produced by Dick Randall, and starring Christopher George, Lynda Day George, Frank Braña, Edmund Purdom, Paul L. Smith, Ian Sera, and Jack Taylor.

The plot follows an unknown assailant killing female students at a college campus in Boston, who uses their body parts to make a human jigsaw puzzle. A co-production of Spain and the United States, Pieces was originally released in Spain in August 1982, and was distributed in the United States by Film Ventures International.

Since its release, the film has attracted a cult following and has been a drive-in favorite. While not prosecuted for obscenity, the film was seized and confiscated in the UK under Section 3 of the Obscene Publications Act 1959 during the video nasty controversy.

Plot
In 1942 in Boston, Massachusetts, 10-year-old Timmy Reston is abused by his mother who compares him to his father for playing with a jigsaw puzzle of a nude woman. After she orders him to dispose of the puzzle, he returns with an axe, murders her, then dismembers her body with a hacksaw. When the police arrive, Timmy hides inside a closet and pretends to be a witness to the crime. The police believe Timmy's story and he is sent to live with his aunt. Forty years later, after witnessing a female skateboarder smash into a mirror, a black-clad figure opens a box containing the bloodied clothing and a photograph of Timmy's mother. He also unboxes the bloodied jigsaw puzzle and starts to put it together.

While studying outside in broad daylight, a female coed is decapitated with a chainsaw by an unidentified killer who steals her head. Lt. Bracken and his partner, Sgt. Holden, investigate the murder. Arthur Brown, a reserved professor of anatomy who is often teased by students for being homosexual, gives the detectives a tour of the school. Outside, the groundskeeper, Willard, is seen trimming a hedge with a chainsaw. In the library, a student named Kendall receives a note given by a girl to come to the pool later; the killer finds it and tracks down the girl at the pool, where she is brutally killed with the chainsaw. Willard later arrives on the scene and is arrested, believed to be a suspect. Near the pool, they find the chainsaw and the girl's body parts, save for her torso. Professor Brown inspects the remains, and is briefly considered a suspect.

The next day, Dr. Jennings meets with Kendall at the station in hopes that he can help provide a profile of the murderer. Bracken brings in an undercover cop named Mary Riggs, who was also a former tennis player. Bracken explains to Holden that she will pose as a tennis instructor at the college and that Kendall is going to assist her whenever he can. As a reporter named Sylvia Costa is stonewalled by Bracken, the killer stalks a girl later that evening and saws her arms off inside an elevator just before Kendall and the police arrive. That same evening, the killer also stalks Sylvia and stabs her on a waterbed.

Later the next day, one of Mary's tennis students, Susie, goes into the locker room after the killer plays music on the loudspeakers. She gets chased down by the killer. As she pees herself, the killer saws into the room and ends up killing Suzie by being sawed in half. While Mary and Kendall focus on turning off the music, the killer steals the girl's legs and escapes. Kendall presents his theory to Holden about the killer being a member of the faculty, since he knows when and where to strike before avoiding the police. They spend hours researching files on the faculty and discover that the dean previously changed his name and that his mother was brutally murdered, discovering that he was Timmy. Meanwhile, Mary is drugged with a paralytic substance by the dean at his apartment. He attempts to saw off her feet, since the previous victim's feet did not fit his mother's shoes for the puzzle. Bracken, Holden, and Kendall burst into the dean's apartment, and he is shot dead by Bracken while Kendall rescues Mary.

After searching through the apartment and discovering the jigsaw puzzle, Holden – joking to Kendall that he should join the police force – leans on a bookshelf which switches around and contains the dean's human puzzle; a decomposing body made of his victims' body parts stitched together and donned in his mother's dress, which tears apart as the jigsaw corpse falls on top of Kendall. Later, a shaken Kendall leaves with Holden, and just as he grabs his jacket, the jigsaw corpse inexplicably comes to life grabbing and crushing Kendall's genitalia, castrating and emasculating him in the process as he screams.

Cast

Analysis
Film scholar Ian Conrich notes in Horror Zone: The Cultural Experience of Contemporary Horror Cinema that Pieces has an "almost self-reflexive awareness of its status as an exploitation film". Conrich summarizes the film as a "hybrid amalgamation" of body horror films, "the pioneering splatter films of Herschell Gordon Lewis", and the Italian giallo. Additionally, Conrich criticizes the film for having a "transparently misogynistic narrative" as well as resembling the aesthetics of pornography, featuring scenarios similar to those found in contemporaneous adult films.

Production

The script for Pieces was written by American exploitation filmmaker Dick Randall and Italian producer Roberto Loyola, credited as "John Shadow". Contrary to popular belief, Joe D'Amato was not involved in this production. It was given to director Juan Piquer Simón by Randall and Stephen Minasian, with whom he had worked on previous films. 

Although the film was set in the United States, specifically in Boston, it was mainly shot in and around Valencia, Spain, home of director Simón, though some exterior filming took place in Boston. The shoot lasted four weeks with the cast and crew, and another week went by to film the special effects for an estimated budget of $300,000. Some of the American exteriors were shots reused from Supersonic Man (1979), also directed by Simón.

According to the interview with Simón in Pieces of Juan (on the Grindhouse DVD version of the film), the director says that none of the female stars of the film knew how to play tennis, even though they were supposed to be portraying "professional" players. A tennis coach had to be hired so that they could learn to lob the ball in a convincing enough manner to make the film believable. Simón also revealed in the interview that he is proud of the visual effects in the film, especially that a pig carcass was used for the effect of the chainsaw cutting through a young woman's stomach and the slaughterhouse guts used.

The film starred real-life husband and wife team Christopher George (of TV's The Rat Patrol) and Lynda Day George (of TV's Mission: Impossible)).

While the Spanish version had an original musical score by Librado Pastor, the international release used library music from several composers (including Stelvio Cipriani and Fabio Frizzi), collectively credited as 'CAM'.

Release
Pieces was first released in Spain on August 23, 1982. It opened in the United States the following year in Los Angeles on October 14, 1983 through Film Ventures International.

The film has gone on to receive numerous revival screenings since its original release, often as part of the Grindhouse Film Festival.

Critical response
On the review aggregator website Rotten Tomatoes, Pieces holds a 46% approval rating based on 13 critic reviews, with an average rating of 3.64/10.

Kevin Thomas, film critic for the Los Angeles Times gave the film a negative review, writing, "Pieces is a wretched, stupid little picture whose sole purpose is the exploitation of extreme violence against women", and further criticized it for being poorly dubbed and lacking suspense. Billy Kelley, entertainment writer for the Fort Lauderdale News, awarded the film no stars, describing Pieces as a "gross-out extravaganza" and a "bargain basement abomination".

In a retrospective review, Alex McLevy of The A.V. Club wrote that the film's "narrative is pedestrian as hell, but damn, the execution. The movie manages to luck into that ideal combination of over-the-top bloodshed, gratuitous nudity (of both male and female types, though the latter is, as expected, the mainstage show), and unintentional absurdity for which enthusiasts of the genre are perpetually on the hunt". Bill Gibron of PopMatters wrote of the film: "Thanks to VHS and the thriving home video market, the sleazoid shocker became an instant cult classic...  Pieces is the kind of fright film that sneaks up on you. It is really nothing more than your standard slasher effort with a chainsaw doing all the slice and dice (well, there are a couple of knife kills thrown in for good massacre measure)".

Film scholar Scott Aaron Stine was less laudatory of the film, writing that it blends elements of the giallo and the slasher film "without adding anything new to either". Scholar John Kenneth Muir notes that the film features sequences "so poorly staged" that they "elicit laughter", ultimately deeming the film "utterly absurd from start to finish".

Home media
The uncut, uncensored director's cut of Pieces (a.k.a. Mil gritos tiene la noche) appeared as a 2-disc DVD in October 2008 distributed by Grindhouse Releasing and Box Office Spectaculars. The release includes interviews with director Juan Piquer Simón and an extended interview with star Paul L. Smith. The two-disc deluxe edition by Grindhouse includes, for the first time, an (optional) restored original soundtrack by Spanish composer Librado Pastor, as well as numerous other bonus materials. In September 2011, the British company Arrow Video released the film on DVD in a 1.66:1 anamorphic aspect ratio version with an introduction by star Jack Taylor and a number of other extras.

Grindhouse released a double Blu-ray edition of Pieces in March 2016, which also featured the soundtrack on compact disc.  The Blu-ray discs include the U.S. theatrical and Spanish versions of the film, a new documentary about the history of 42nd Street called 42nd Street Memories, a re-scoring of the film, a new commentary for the U.S. version by star Jack Taylor, and the extras from the 2008 special edition DVD release. The CD includes the original soundtrack of the U.S. release of the film, a collection of library music licensed from CAM (Creazioni Artistiche Musicali), taken from the original master tapes.  In addition, the first 3,000 units of the special edition included a 15-piece facsimile of the nude woman puzzle seen in the beginning of the film. This 3,000-unit limited edition, known as the "Puzzle Edition", was shipped out to customers early, and as of February 8, 2016, was sold out.

Notes

References

Sources

External links
 
 
 

1982 films
1982 horror films
1982 independent films
1980s slasher films
1980s Spanish-language films
American slasher films
American independent films
American splatter films
American serial killer films
American exploitation films
Spanish horror films
Spanish independent films
Spanish slasher films
Spanish splatter films
Spanish serial killer films
English-language Spanish films
Films about sexual repression
Films directed by Juan Piquer Simon
Films scored by Stelvio Cipriani
Films set in 1942
Films set in 1982
Films set in Boston
Films set in universities and colleges
Films shot in Dedham, Massachusetts
Films shot in Madrid
LGBT-related horror films
Matricide in fiction
Supernatural slasher films
1980s American films
1980s erotic films
1980s exploitation films
1980s Spanish films